Ansaldo was one of Italy's oldest and most important engineering companies, existing for 140 years from 1853 to 1993.

History

19th century foundation 

The company was founded in 1853 as Gio. Ansaldo & C. S.A.S. by renowned players in the Genoese business world, such as Giovanni Ansaldo, Raffaele Rubattino, Giacomo Filippo Penco and Carlo Bombrini. Until the end of the 19th century, the company focused on manufacturing and repairing railway components, quickly becoming a 10,000-worker company with seven factories, and starting to expand into sectors such as shipbuilding and mechanical works in general.

20th century expansion and dissolution 

In 1904, Ansaldo was bought by Ferdinando Maria Perrone who, along with his sons Mario and Pio, bound the name of the Perrone family to the history of the company. Over the next twenty years, he aimed at making Ansaldo fully independent both in the ironworks and weapon-making areas, thanks to strong vertical integration. The onset of World War I was of obvious potential benefit to the company, though Italy was initially neutral. Ansaldo advocated for Italian entry into the war, both directly and by funding political groups that supported the war, such as Benito Mussolini's proto-Fascist movement.

The efforts paid off when Italy entered the war. In 1914 the company was worth 30 million lire, but its market value grew to 500 million in 1918. When the company issued shares in the summer of 1918 worth 400 million lire Ansaldo employed 80,000 workers, had dozens of factories and controlled companies such as A. Cerpelli & C., Banca industriale Italiana, Cantieri Officine Savoia, Dynamit Nobel, Gio.Fossati & C., Lloyd Italico, Nazionale di Navigazione, Pomilio, Società Idroelettrica Negri, and Transatlantica Italiana.

Following a financial crisis with its largest creditor, Banca Italiana di Sconto, and problems in reconverting factories after the end of World War I, the Perrone family abandoned the company in 1921, and the Banca d'Italia led a consortium to save it from bankruptcy.  Company strategies were drastically sized down, and during the 1920s, even though electro-mechanical productions grew significantly, Ansaldo found itself in such dire difficulties that it finally entered the control of the Istituto per la Ricostruzione Industriale (IRI), under which the company found new life and growth, partly thanks to the new war effort during fascism.  The main figure in this rebirth, the engineer Agostino Rocca, reconfigured the structure and organisation of the company during his tenure as chief executive officer from 1935 to the end of World War II.  War contracts indeed led to a significant growth: Ansaldo had 22,000 employees in 1939, and 35,000 in 1943.

After the end of World War II, conversion to peacetime production again caused problems for the company. In 1948, IRI entrusted the company to Finmeccanica, which operated several reorganisation measures during the 1950s and 1960s, such as the relinquishing of all shipbuilding activities to Italcantieri of Trieste in 1966. From that year, Finmeccanica further engaged Ansaldo within its activities, and in 1980 they formed Italy's largest thermo-electric group. In 1993, Ansaldo ceased to exist as an independent entity, having been completely absorbed by Finmeccanica.

Aftermath in the 21st century 
Some companies controlled by Leonardo S.p.A. still bear the Ansaldo family name:
 Ansaldo Energia, involved in building electric power plants, based in Genoa.
 Ansaldo Caldaie, involved in building fired Steam Generators. Sofinter Group (Private Company located in Gallarate, Italy).
 Ansaldo Ricerche, involved in nuclear fusion technology, founded in 1987 by merging various research and development departments of Ansaldo and Nucleare Italiana Reattori Avanzati; it takes part in the international ITER project.
 Ansaldo Fuel Cells, founded in 1993 as a spin-off of the former, devoted to fuel cells.
 Ansaldo Nucleare, founded in 1989 by merging Ansaldo Meccanico Nucleare and Nucleare Italiana Reattori Avanzati; in 1999, it was absorbed by Ansaldo Energia, but in 2005 it was re-founded as a separate company, although 100%-controlled by Ansaldo Energia.
 Nidec ASI (formerly Ansaldo Industrial Systems). Former Finmeccanica Company, sold to the Japanese Nidec Group, in 2012 Nidec acquired Ansaldo Sistemi Industriali SpA. and becomes Nidec ASI S.p.A. Nidec ASI is a manufacturer of electric motors, their products are found in electrical engineering, electric motors and generators, control systems and automation for industrial applications. Nidec ASI is headquartered in Milan and has different subsidiaries in Italy in Genoa, Montebello Vicentino, Monfalcone and abroad in China, France, Germany, Romania, Russia, Japan and Singapore.

Products

Aircraft production

Ansaldo Baby (1915) single seat biplane reconnaissance floatplane, a British Sopwith Baby built under licence with minor changes
Ansaldo A.1 Balilla (1917) Single-engine one-seat biplane fighter aircraft
Ansaldo SVA.1 (1917) Single-engine one-seat biplane utility aircraft
SVA.2 Production version of SVA.1
SVA.3 Fast-climbing interceptor version of SVA.2
SVA.4 Production version of SVA.2 equipped for reconnaissance
SVA.5 Production version of SVA.2
SVA.6 Prototype bomber version of SVA.2
SVA.8 Single prototype (purpose unknown)
SVA.9 Two-seat unarmed reconnaissance version with larger wings
SVA.10 Armed version of SVA.9
Ansaldo A.120 Parasol reconnaissance fighter
Ansaldo A.300 (1919) Single-engine two-seat biplane utility aircraft.  Three-seat versions were also built for reconnaissance use.
Ansaldo AC.1 designation for imported French Dewoitine D.1 single-engine two-seat parasol-wing fighter
Ansaldo AC.2 (1922) licence-built French Dewoitine D.1
Ansaldo AC.3 (1924) licence-built French Dewoitine D.9 (a development of the D.1)
Ansaldo AC.4 (1927) AC.2 with 420 hp (313.2 kW) FIAT A.20 engine.

Ships 

, cruiser built for the Regia Marina, 1899
, battleship built for the Regia Marina, 1911
, built for the Navigazione Generale Italiana, 1926
, cruiser built for the Regia Marina, 1930
, cruiser built for the Regia Marina, 1930
, cruiser built for the Regia Marina, 1930
, built for the Italian Line, 1931
, cruiser built for the Regia Marina, 1934
, cruiser built for the Regia Marina, 1935
, battleship built for the Regia Marina, 1937
, aircraft carrier built for the Regia Marina, 1941
, Ansaldo Shipyards of Genoa, 1951
, built for the Italian Line, 1960
, built for the Italian Line, 1965

Armored vehicles 

 Ansaldo Armored Car (1925)
  Fiat-Ansaldo CV-33 (1935- )
 L3/35
 L6/40 tank (designed by Ansaldo, manufactured by Fiat, 1940- )

Rolling stock

Locomotives 
 D.341
 D.345
 E.424
 D.443
 E.402
 E.428
 E.491
 E.492
 E.636
 E.656

See also

 Finmeccanica
 Ansaldo Energia
 Ansaldo STS
 AnsaldoBreda

References

External links
 Fondazione Ansaldo —, devoted to documenting Ansaldo in Italian industrial history.
 Stedo.it:  Gio. Ansaldo & C. history—
 Official Leonardo website
 - Ansaldo Energia website
 - Ansaldo Ricerche website
 - Ansaldo Fuel Cells website
 - Ansaldo Nucleare website
 - Ansaldobreda website
 - Ansaldo Boiler website
 - Sofinter Group website

 
Defence companies of Italy
Defunct manufacturing companies of Italy
Ansaldo
Engineering companies of Italy
Shipbuilding companies of Italy
Conglomerate companies of Italy
Multinational companies headquartered in Italy
Design companies established in 1853
Manufacturing companies established in 1853
Non-renewable resource companies established in 1853
Manufacturing companies disestablished in 1993
Non-renewable resource companies disestablished in 1993
1853 establishments in the Kingdom of Sardinia
1993 establishments in Italy
AnsaldoBreda
Italian brands
Sampierdarena